The Banavie Railway Swing Bridge carries the West Highland Line across the Caledonian Canal at Banavie.

History
Construction of the extension from Mallaig Extension Railway began in January 1887, and the line opened on 1 April 1901.

The bridge was manufactured by Alex Findlay & Co. of Motherwell.

Design
The bridge is an asymmetric bow truss, with more reinforcement at the end where it is held.

Its operation is fully automated and is controlled by Network Rail staff in the signal box located only a few yards away. It is adjacent to the Banavie Swing Bridge, which carries the A830 road across the canal.

There is a speed limit of 5mph for trains passing over the bridge.

See also
Banavie
Banavie railway station
Banavie Swing Bridge

References

Sources
 

Swing bridges in Scotland
Bridges in Highland (council area)
Bridges completed in 1901
1901 establishments in Scotland